A list MP is a member of parliament (MP) elected from a party list rather than from by a geographical constituency. The place in Parliament is due to the number of votes that the party won, not to votes received by the MP personally. This occurs only in countries which have an electoral system based wholly or partly on party-list proportional representation.

Different systems
In some countries, seats in the chamber are filled solely in accordance with the share of votes won by each individual party. Thus, in Israel, all Members of the Knesset (MKs) are list members. Under this system, MKs are appointed from lists of candidates created by each party until the party has reached its allocated number. In other countries, a more complicated system is used. In the method used in Japan, South Korea and Taiwan, some seats are filled using party lists, while others are filled by the "traditional" First Past the Post system. Under the Additional Member System, or Mixed Member Proportional, the method used in Germany and New Zealand, a merger of party-list representation and geographic representation is employed — parties contest geographic seats, but are then "topped up" with MPs from a party list.

New Zealand has 120 MPs represented by 5 parliamentary parties, out of which there are 65 general electorate seats and seven Māori electorates, elected using  First Past the Post voting system (FPP); the candidate who gets the most votes wins. The other 48 MPs are selected from the party lists. The List MPs each party gets is the difference between a party's total allocation of seats in parliament and its number of electorate MPs.

Controversies
The existence of list MPs has caused controversy in some countries. It is sometimes complained that because list MPs do not have a geographic electorate, they are not properly accountable to anyone. In addition, the methods used to create party lists are sometimes criticised as undemocratic — in a closed list system, the public have no way of influencing the composition of a party list. In this situation, the public cannot support one candidate without also supporting other candidates from the same party. Supporters of party list proportional representation sometimes retort that the public often have little control over the selection of local candidates, either — if a voter's preferred party selects a poor candidate, the voter is forced to either vote for a candidate they dislike or vote for a party they dislike. Under a party list system, voters can support their preferred party even if they are unwilling to vote for its local candidate.

An open list system, however, may go some way to addressing the concern that voters can only support all the candidates that were proposed by the party. A notable example of this was in the 2006 Dutch general election. The VVD had chosen Mark Rutte as their list puller (lijsttrekker). In the Netherlands, the party leader usually gets a large majority of the votes for that party, but in 2006 the number 2 on the list, Rita Verdonk got over 10% more votes than Mark Rutte. This eventually led to Rita Verdonk leaving the VVD and starting her own party.

There is also debate about the right of a list MP to switch parties. Because list MPs gain their positions by virtue of being on a party list, rather than by winning votes personally, some contend that the party, not the MP, is the rightful "owner" of the seat. In New Zealand, there have been several controversies regarding list MPs who left their parties — Alamein Kopu, elected from the Alliance list, controversially became an independent, and Donna Awatere Huata, elected from the ACT list, similarly became an independent. In the latter case, Awatere Huata's former party went to the Supreme Court to expel her from Parliament under so-called waka jumping or "party-hopping" legislation. ACT alleged that it was ACT, not Awatere Huata, who was awarded the seat in the last election, and that when Awatere Huata left ACT, she should not have been able to take the seat with her. ACT's view was accepted, and Awatere Huata was expelled from Parliament.

References

Legislators
Proportional representation electoral systems